Sangha Assembly constituency is one of the 32 assembly constituencies of Sikkim, a state in the Northeast region of India. It is a part of the Sikkim Lok Sabha constituency. As of 2014, Sonam Lama is the holder of this seat. His current term is expected to end by 2024.

This seat is reserved for the Buddhist monastic community (Sangha) of Sikkim. Buddhist monks and nuns, registered with the 111 recognized monasteries in the state, are the only ones who can contest and cast their votes for this Assembly seat.

Members of Sikkim State Council
The Sangha constituency was created in 1958 for the Sikkim State Council, after requests from the monastery associations to the Chogyal.

Members of Legislative Assembly
After the 1975 Sikkimese monarchy referendum, Sikkim became a state of India and the members of the State Council at the time, were deemed to be the Legislative Assembly of the new state of Sikkim.

Supreme Court Case 
In 1993, a case was brought in the Supreme Court of India, challenging the reservation for the Sangha constituency and for the Bhutia-Lepcha constituencies in Sikkim, by Ram Chandra Poudyal of the Rising Sun Party. The Supreme Court dismissed the petition, judging that the Sangha had played a major part in previous Councils' decision-making and the reservation is not based purely on religious distinctions and is, therefore, not unconstitutional.

Election Results

2019

2014

2009

2004

1999

1994

1989

1985

1979

Sikkim State Council

1974

1973
In the 1973 election, Peyching Lama was elected unopposed.

1970

1967

See also
 List of constituencies of the Sikkim Legislative Assembly
 List of Buddhist monasteries in Sikkim
 Sikkim Lok Sabha constituency
 Reserved political positions in India

References

Further reading
 

Assembly constituencies of Sikkim
1958 establishments in Sikkim
Constituencies established in 1958